Fredrik Sterky (1860–1900) was an early Social Democrat and trade union organizer in Sweden. Fredrik Sterky co-founded and was chairman of the Swedish Trade Union Confederation from 1898. He was also the editor of Ny Tid.

He was the partner of the trade unionist Anna Sterky.

References

Swedish Social Democratic Party politicians
Swedish trade unionists
1860 births
1900 deaths
19th-century Swedish people